Aryenis of Lydia was, according to Herodotus, the daughter of King Alyattes of Lydia and the sister of King Croesus of Lydia.

Name
The name  comes from the Latin transliteration of the Ancient Greek , which was itself the Hellenised form of a Lydian name cognate with the Hittite term  , which meant "free", that is a free person, as opposed to an enslaved or unfree person.

Family 
Following the Battle of the Eclipse, was married to Astyages, son of the Median king Cyaxares as part of a diplomatic marriage to seal a peace treaty between Cyaxares and Alyattes. Aryenis became the Queen consort of Astyages when he succeeded Cyaxares.

Herodotus does not clearly identify her as the mother of Mandane (the wife of Cambyses I of Anshan) and there is speculation that she may have been born to an earlier wife of Astyages.

Sources

Ancient queens consort
Lydians
Median people
6th-century BC women
Ancient Persian women
6th-century BC Iranian people
Ancient princesses
Median dynasty